Harold Marsh Sewall (January 3, 1860 – October 28, 1924) was an American politician and diplomat.

Sewall was born in Bath, Sagadahoc County, Maine. He was the son of Arthur Sewall. Sewall served in the Maine House of Representatives, 1896, and from 1903 to 1907; he was a  delegate to Republican National Convention from Maine, 1896. He was the last United States Minister to Hawaii, arriving in 1897 to the Republic of Hawaii after the death of Albert Sydney Willis, and returning in 1898 after annexation formed the Territory of Hawaii.
He was a member of the Maine State Senate, from 1907 to 1909 and was a candidate for the United States representative from Maine 2nd district, 1914; member of Republican National Committee from Maine, 1924. He died in a hospital at New York City. His interment was at Oak Grove Cemetery, Bath, Maine.

References

External links
 

1860 births
1924 deaths
Ambassadors of the United States to Hawaii
People from Bath, Maine
Republican Party Maine state senators
Republican Party members of the Maine House of Representatives
Harvard University alumni